Liberty County Airport  was a county-owned public-use airport in Liberty County, Georgia, United States. The airport was closed in 2008, when local civilian entities and the U.S. Army teamed up to open the joint use MidCoast Regional Airport at Wright Army Airfield.

Facilities and aircraft 
The property has been transferred to the Liberty County School Board, which built the Liberty County College and Career Academy on the property. 

For the 12-month period ending July 18, 2006, the airport had 4,000 general aviation aircraft operations, an average of 10 per day.

See also 
 MidCoast Regional Airport at Wright Army Airfield, a new general aviation facility which opened in November 2007 at Fort Stewart in Liberty County.

References

External links 

 

Defunct airports in Georgia (U.S. state)
Airports in Georgia (U.S. state)
Buildings and structures in Liberty County, Georgia
Transportation in Liberty County, Georgia